"Na Na" is a song by American singer Trey Songz, released on January 21, 2014 as the lead single from his sixth studio album, Trigga (2014) which was released on July 1, 2014. The song features production from West Coast hip hop producer DJ Mustard, and the chorus interpolates the Fugees' hit "Fu-Gee-La" (1996).

Music video
On March 13, 2014, Trey Songz released the official music video of "Na Na", which was directed by Gil Green and features WWE Superstars The Bella Twins and model Rosa Acosta.

Chart performance
Na Na debuted at number 91 on the US Billboard Hot 100 on the week of February 8, 2014. On the week of July 19, 2014, the single reached its peak position at number 21 on the chart. On May 2, 2019, the single was certified double platinum by the Recording Industry Association of America (RIAA) for combined sales and streaming data of over two million units in the United States.

Track listing

Charts

Weekly charts

Year-end charts

Certifications

Release history

See also
List of Airplay 100 number ones of the 2010s

References

2014 singles
2014 songs
Trey Songz songs
Atlantic Records singles
Song recordings produced by Mustard (record producer)
Songs written by Mustard (record producer)
Number-one singles in Romania